Zarina Kapustina (born 15 November 1998) is a Belarusian footballer who plays as a midfielder and has appeared for the Belarus women's national team.

Career
Kapustina has been capped for the Belarus national team, appearing for the team during the 2019 FIFA Women's World Cup qualifying cycle.

References

External links
 
 
 

1998 births
Living people
Belarusian women's footballers
Belarus women's international footballers
Women's association football defenders